Translation initiation factor eIF-2B subunit epsilon is a protein that in humans is encoded by the EIF2B5 gene.

Interactions 

EIF2B5 has been shown to interact with EIF2B2 and EIF2B1.

References

Further reading